The Nebraska State Court of Appeals is the intermediate level appellate court for the state of Nebraska.

Judges

Chief Judge Frankie J. Moore
Judge David K. Arterburn
Judge Michael W. Pirtle
Judge Francie C. Riedmann
Judge Riko E. Bishop
Judge Lawrence E. Welch Jr.

See also
Nebraska Supreme Court

References

External links 
Nebraska Court of Appeals

Appeals
State appellate courts of the United States
1991 establishments in Nebraska
Courts and tribunals established in 1991